Saul Weigopwa (born 14 June 1984 in Song, Nigeria) is a Nigerian athlete, who specializes in the 400 m, where his personal best is 45.00s (a result he has achieved twice).

At the 2004 Summer Olympic Games Weigopwa competed in 400 m, where he was knocked out in the semi finals with 45.67s. He was also part of the Nigerian team that won the bronze medal in 4 × 400 m relay.

External links

sports-reference

Nigerian male sprinters
1984 births
Living people
Athletes (track and field) at the 2004 Summer Olympics
Athletes (track and field) at the 2008 Summer Olympics
Athletes (track and field) at the 2006 Commonwealth Games
Olympic athletes of Nigeria
Olympic bronze medalists for Nigeria
Medalists at the 2004 Summer Olympics
Olympic bronze medalists in athletics (track and field)
African Games silver medalists for Nigeria
African Games medalists in athletics (track and field)
Athletes (track and field) at the 2007 All-Africa Games
Commonwealth Games competitors for Nigeria
21st-century Nigerian people